Pandit Kumar Bose (Bangla পন্ডিত কুমার বোস), born 4 April 1953, is an Indian tabla musician and composer of Indian classical music.

Family
Bose was born in Kolkata in a musical family.  His father, Biswanath Bose, a tabla player, taught him his first lessons in rhythm.

His mother Vidushi Bharati Bose was a sitarist and disciple of Dabir Khan and Ali Akbar Khan Bharati received several awards in her career, including recognition as an All India Radio Artist and the President's Award for Best Sitar Performance in 1956.  She guided her son with the basic forms of classical music and helped him to groom himself into professional tabla player.

His brother Acharya Jayanta Bose is an internationally reputed composer, lyrist, harmonium soloist and singer, while his brother Debojyoti Bose is a sarod player and music director.

Music career
Bose's first teacher was his father.  After his father's death, he was taught by Kishan Maharaj (1923–2008).

Performances
Bose gave his first public performance at the age of 4.  By 14, he performed abroad and has played at almost every major music halls in the world since.  He has performed at the Royal Albert Hall and the Barbican Centre in London, the Kremlin in Moscow, the Lincoln Center for the Performing Arts and Carnegie Hall in New York, and at various venues throughout India. In addition to that, Kumar Bose performed at the Aga Khan Museum in Toronto, Canada in 2019 for the Raag-Mala Music Society of Toronto.

Achievements
 Received the Sangeet Natak Akademi award in 2007 in recognition of his contributions to music.

Discography

 Drums of India -Tabla Solo		HMV		STCS 850792
 Ustad Vilayet Khan		        HMV		STCS O4B 7265
 SMRITI – Pt. Ravi Shankar		HMV		CHIX 1026
 Pandit Vishwa Mohan Bhatt		HMV		STCS 02B 6279
 Enchanting Folk Melodies on Instrumental Trio HMV	HTCS 02B 2708
 SITAR VADAN- Pandit Nikhil Banerjee. Vol -I	  VENUS	VCBG – 015
 SITAR VADAN – Pandit Nikhil Banerjee. Vol-II VENUS	VCBG – 016
 AFTAAB-E-SITAR-Ustad Vilayet Khan	EMI		STCS 04B 7208
 INSTRUMENTAL TRIO – Vol-I		HMV		STCS 850318
 INSTRUMENTAL TRIO- Vol-II		HMV		STCS 850319
 SPIRIT OF FREEDOM CONCERT – Pandit Ravi Shankar
 Pandit Ravi Shankar		        Music Today
 The Golden Trio		        HMV	
 Pandit V. G. Jog – Violin Recital
 Vishwa Mohan Bhatt	                Concord Records	05-16	
 	 
CDs released are
 
 Raga Ragini – Indian Quintet		Chhanda Dhara	SP 84188
 Genesis		                Milan	        CDCH 287 RC690	
 Spirit of India		        Chhanda Dhara	SP 83688
 Ravi Shankar Inside the Kremlin	BMG Records	
 Nishat Khan		                EMI		CD PSLP 5441
 Unique Ravi Shankar		        Chhanda Dhara	SNCD 70991
 Brilliancy and Oldest Tradition – KISHEN MAHARAJ AND KUMAR BOSE Chhanda Dhara SNCD 70493
 Golden Jubilee Concert – Pt. Ravi Shankar Chhanda Dhara SNCD 70390
 Sublime Sounds of Sitar		Oriental Records CD 116
 Pandit Ravi Shankar		        OCORA		@558674 HM90
 Darbar Music Festival – 2006 Darbar Music

See also
Kishan Maharaj
Shankar Ghosh
Zakir Hussain
Chandra Nath Shastri
Anindo Chatterjee
Swapan Chaudhuri
Yogesh Samsi
Ananda Gopal Bandopadhyay
Rajkumar Misra

References

External links
 Official site

1953 births
Hindustani instrumentalists
Indian drummers
Living people
Musicians from Kolkata
Recipients of the Sangeet Natak Akademi Award
Tabla players
Hindustani composers
Indian male classical musicians